Timor is an island in southeast Asia comprising East Timor and part of Indonesia known as West Timor. 

Timor may also refer to:

 Timor, Victoria, a place in Australia
 Timor (mythology), the god of fear and horror in Roman mythology
 "Timor", a song by Shakira from the 2005 album Oral Fixation, Vol. 2
Timor Putra Nasional, commonly known as Timor, a former Indonesian automotive company 
 Bar Timor (born 1992), Israeli basketball player
 An uncommon variation of the Turkic name, "Timur"

See also

 Timur (disambiguation)
 Timur (name), a Turkic and Mongolic name and a variety of people with that name
 Timur (1336–1405), a Central Asian ruler and conqueror